Santa Cruz Airport or Santacruz Airport may refer to:

 Santa Cruz Airport (Argentina), serving Santa Cruz and Puerto Santa Cruz
 Santa Cruz Airport (Chile), serving Santa Cruz
 Santa Cruz Airfield (Portugal), an aerodrome in Torres Vedras
 Santa Cruz Island Airport, in Santa Barbara, California, US
 Chhatrapati Shivaji Maharaj International Airport, located in Santacruz, a suburb of Mumbai, India